"Mycolicibacter icosiumassiliensis" (formerly "Mycobacterium icosiumassiliensis") is a species of bacteria from the phylum Actinomycetota.

References

Acid-fast bacilli
icosiumassiliensis
Bacteria described in 2016